The Quest Aircraft Company was an American aircraft manufacturer located in Sandpoint, Idaho. Quest was started in 2001 to design and provide aircraft suitable for humanitarian applications. Its sole product was the Kodiak single engine short takeoff and landing (STOL) aircraft.

In February 2015, the company was sold to Setouchi Holdings of Japan. Setouchi had been acting as a dealer for Quest before purchasing the company. In 2019, Quest was sold to the French industrial group Daher.

History
In 1998, the Idaho Air Group was founded by Tom Hamilton and David Voetmann. Hamilton and Voetmann saw a need to develop an aircraft uniquely suited to the rugged flying environment found in humanitarian aviation. After raising the necessary funding, the Quest Aircraft Company launched in 2001 with a staff of 14. After a 27,000 square foot facility was prepared in 2002, work started on the first prototype aircraft, later leading to the production of the Quest Kodiak.

Paul Schaller became CEO of the company in 2004, and by 2009 the employment force was 340 people.

In 2010 the workforce was reduced to 155 employees, but 2011 saw infusion of capital and a change in executive leadership, with Schaller migrating to a consulting role in the company.

Sam Hill was the CEO from 2012 to January 2017, after previous experience at Embraer Aircraft Corporation and Honda Aircraft Company.

In February 2015, the company was purchased by Setouchi Holdings, part of the Tsuneishi Group of Japan.

A  research and development hangar  was also completed.

In January 2017, Robert H. Wells was named CEO, having been in management at Tag Aviation, Beechcraft and Landmark Aviation.

On June 13, 2019, French industrial conglomerate Daher announced its acquisition of Quest Aircraft from Setouchi Holdings. The deal was completed by October 1, 2019, after which Quest was renamed Kodiak Aircraft and then absorbed into the parent company.

Products
 Quest Kodiak

See also
 List of companies based in Idaho

References
 Marsh, Alton K. AOPA Pilot 2006

External links

 CAM Case Study of Quest Kodiak

Aircraft manufacturers of the United States
Companies based in Idaho
2004 establishments in Idaho